Philip II (2 May 1533 – 4 April 1596), Duke of Brunswick-Lüneburg, a member of the House of Welf, was the last ruler of the Principality of Grubenhagen from 1595 until his death.  When he died in 1596, the Grubenhagen branch of the Welfs became extinct, whereafter the principality was occupied by Duke Henry Julius of Brunswick-Wolfenbüttel.

Life
Philip II was one of the many children of his father Duke Philip I of Brunswick-Grubenhagen and his wife Catherine of Mansfeld (1501–1535). Philip II was the youngest of nine siblings, six of whom reached adulthood. After Duke Philip I's death in 1551, he was first succeeded in government by his eldest son Ernest III. After Ernest's death in 1567, his brother Wolfgang succeeded. When he too died without male descendants in 1595, Philip II succeeded.  

Duke Philip II was married to his cousin Clara of Brunswick-Wolfenbüttel (1532–1595), designated Abbess of Gandersheim, who had renounced her ecclesiastical office after the abbey had been occupied by Schmalkaldic troops in the course of the Protestant Reformation and plundered afterwards. The couple took residence at the secularised monastery of Katlenburg, which Philip II had rebuilt in a Renaissance style.

In 1595 Duke Philipp II moved his residence from Katlenburg to Herzberg Castle. He reigned less than one year. When he died without a male heir in 1596, the Grubenhagen side-line of the Welfs died out and the Principality of Grubenhagen was annexed by his cousin Henry Julius of Brunswick-Wolfenbüttel. However, the Lüneburg branch of the Welf dynasty objected to the annexation and took the matter to the Reichskammergericht. In 1617, after a prolonged legal case, Henry Julius's son Frederick Ulrich had to cede the former Principality of Grubenhagen to Duke Christian of Brunswick-Lüneburg.

Duke Philip's final resting place is next to his parents and brothers in the crypt of St. Giles Church in Osterode am Harz.
His wife Clara died in 1595.

Ancestors

References 
 Paul Zimmermann: Das Haus Braunschweig-Grubenhagen, Wolfenbüttel, 1911

External links 
 Information about Philip II at www.welfen.de

Princes of Grubenhagen
1533 births
1596 deaths
16th-century German people
Old House of Brunswick